"Looking Down" is the second and final single from the debut and only major record label album, Dirty Sexy Knights in Paris, by the alternative rock band Audiovent. The song appeared on the Billboard Hot Mainstream Rock Tracks chart in 2002, peaking at no. 29, but was unable to match the top 10 performance of its predecessor, "The Energy", released earlier in the year.

Background
The song originated from the 1999 album Papa's Dojo, released independently while the band was still performing under their original name, Vent. For the band's major label debut, Dirty Sexy Knights in Paris, the band decided to rework much of Papa's Dojo once they had the funding to use a professional studio and music producer, Gavin Mackillop. The band chose "Looking Down" as the album's second single, after "The Energy", and released an accompanying music video in October 2002.

Themes and composition
Vocalist Jason Boyd stated that the song was self-referential in relation to the band's ties to the band Incubus. He stated "[It] kind of has to do with the whole Incubus thing... It's about how we are gonna set ourselves apart in time and we’re gonna make it. We’re gonna do what we set out to do from the very beginning. It’s kind of our inspiration song as a band."

Reception
Margo Whitmire of Billboard described the track as a "lyrically haunting" look at "the unfettered freedoms that true independence can bring". MTV described the song's sound as "a triumphant cut" due to it combining of "echoey guitars", "restrained vocals with more agitated tones", and featuring the chorus, "We’ll stand on top of the world looking down." Many critics compared Jason Boyd's vocals to his brother's vocals, Brandon Boyd of Incubus, with "Looking Down" commonly cited the track as being the most clear-cut example of this.

Personnel
Band
Jason Boyd - lead vocals
Benjamin Einziger - guitar, backing vocals
Paul Fried -bass
Jamin Wilcox - drums

Chart performance

References

2002 singles
2002 songs
Atlantic Records singles